Turkmenbashi International Airport  is an international airport located in the city of Türkmenbaşy, Turkmenistan. It accepts both passenger and cargo flights. It opened in 1959 and is one of the five major international airports in Turkmenistan.

History
The airport was constructed in the 1950s and was an interceptor aircraft facility for the Soviet Air Force. It initially operated the Sukhoi Su-9 (Fishpot) in the 1960s and 1970s.  The regiment replaced it in 1978 with the MiG-23M (Flogger-B).  In the 1990s, the Turkmen Air Force took over operation of the military base.

Until 2011, the airfield had the main runway 16/34. The airfield was capable of receiving aircraft of most types, including An-225, An-124 and Il-76 (with partial load), An-22, Tu-154, Boeing-757 and all lighter ones, as well as helicopters of all types. In 2011, the construction of a new runway 16R/34L was completed, its classification number (PCN) is 70/R/A/X/T, dimensions are 3500 × 45 m (cement concrete). The commissioning of the new runway allows the airport to receive aircraft of all types.

Facilities

Passenger terminal
In April 2010, a new four-story terminal building was opened with a capacity of 800 passengers per hour. In addition to this, a new control tower was put into operation. The airport can now take 7 flights simultaneously while providing international standards of service. The total area of the plot on which the new terminal is located, is about 80 hectares. The neighborhood is landscaped, planted and decorated with fountains. There are also indoor and outdoor parking areas for more than three hundred and eighty cars. At the opening of the International Airport of Turkmenbashy it was visited by President of Turkmenistan Gurbanguly Berdimuhamedov.

VIP terminal 
In the immediate vicinity of the main body of the terminal there is a facility to receive VIP-persons. It is used for VIP charter and business aviation, as well as to receive special flights and departure of delegations of the Government of Turkmenistan and guests of city of Türkmenbaşy. The building has all the facilities for meetings and conferences.

Cargo terminal 
In addition to the main terminal there is also an international cargo terminal and a freight transportation service equipped with automated handling.

Airlines and destinations

Access 
Passengers can get to the airport by car either from Turkmenbashi or along the highway from the Avaza resort. There is a free parking in front of the airport.

Turkmenawtoulaglary Agency operates a bus service from airport to Turkmenbashi city and Türkmenbaşy District.

References

External links
 Official web-site
 Turkmenbashi Airport in Polimeks

Airports in Turkmenistan